Arthurella is a genus of flies in the family Muscidae.

Selected species
 Arthurella choelensis Patitucci & Mariluis, 2011
 Arthurella nudiseta Albuquerque, 1954

References

Muscidae genera